"Leave a Trace" is a song by British synth-pop band Chvrches from their second studio album Every Open Eye. It was released as the band's first official single on 17 July 2015 via Virgin and Goodbye Records.

Background
During an interview with Pitchfork, Lauren Mayberry said of the song:

Release history
"Leave a Trace" was streamed on the band's official SoundCloud page.

Critical reception
The song received generally positive reviews. Luke Winstanley of Clash called the song "another highlight, outrageously infectious and immediate, all centred around a gentle but persistent bass pulse." Sam Shepherd of musicOMH felt it "finds Mayberry certain of her feelings and finding closure, and delivering a sweet vocal that drills deep into the pleasure centres." Abby Johnston of The Austin Chronicle called Mayberry's performance in the song "at the level of a modern-day Cyndi Lauper."

Rolling Stone placed "Leave a Trace" at number 24 on its list of the 50 Best Songs of 2015. Billboard ranked "Leave a Trace" at number fourteen on its year-end list: "On 'Leave a Trace', Iain Cook and Martin Doherty’s fine-tuned swirls of synthesizer are just begging for a killer hook, and Mayberry -- singing with more swagger than ever before -- hammers it home."

Music video

Background
A music video for the song was released on 17 August 2015.

Consequence of Sound said of the music video:

4chan Harassment
On 17 August 2015, a user on internet forum 4chan posted a link to the music video to /mu/, 4chan's music board. Hundreds of comments followed, many of which were sexually explicit remarks and such sexist slurs as "slut", "whore", and "bitch" directed toward Mayberry. Other comments called Mayberry a hypocrite for her solo appearance in the video while concurrently being an outspoken feminist and expressing her disdain for the objectification of women.

One participant in the thread tweeted at Mayberry, requesting her input. Mayberry blocked the user and responded to the thread in her own tweet, writing "Dear anyone who thinks misogyny isn't real. It is and this is what is looks like," with a link to the 4chan thread. Mayberry's bandmates defended her in a tweet from the band's account, writing "PSA: apparently wet hair makes you a 'slut'. Nice work, 4chan / humanity."

French scholar Albin Wagener studied this specific case in a scientific paper, showing how online discrimination was organized in online forums, when related to sexism.

Track listing

Charts

Weekly charts

Year-end charts

References

2015 singles
2015 songs
Chvrches songs
Songs written by Iain Cook
Songs written by Lauren Mayberry
Songs written by Martin Doherty
Virgin Records singles